Chernyaev is a Russian masculine surname, its feminine counterpart is Chernyaeva. It may refer to
Anatoly Chernyaev (1921–2017), Russian historian and writer
Irina Cherniaeva (born 1955), Russian pair skater
Mikhail Chernyayev (1828–1898), Russian military leader

See also
Chernenko (surname), Ukrainian equivalent

Russian-language surnames